Evolve Vacation Rental is a national vacation rental management company based in Denver, Colorado. The company services more than 22,000 short-term rental properties throughout North America.

References 

Companies based in Denver
Real estate companies established in 2011
Property management companies
2011 establishments in Colorado